BugAboo (commonly stylized as bugAboo), was a South Korean girl group formed and managed by A Team Entertainment. The group was composed of six members: Eunchae, Yoona, Rainie, Cyan, Choyeon, and Zin. The group made their debut on October 25, 2021, with the release of their eponymous single album. After a year and two months of activities, the group officially disbanded on December 8, 2022.

Name 
The name BugAboo means a fearful and surprising existence in the imagination, and contains the determination and meaning of "Let's overcome the fearful existence in our hearts together and realize our dreams". It was also revealed by A Team that the name was also inspired by Peek-a-boo.

History

2018–2021: Pre-debut activities 
In 2018, Eunchae (then representing Million Market) and Choyeon competed in Produce 48, finishing 32nd and 50th, respectively. It was revealed in an interview with Ryan S. Jhun, the group's producer and CEO of A Team Entertainment, that bugAboo was originally scheduled to debut in 2020, but it was postponed and then moved to the fall of 2021. The group went by the tentative name A Team Dream, and they covered songs on their now-defunct YouTube channel.

2021–2022: Introduction, BugAboo, Pop and disbandment 
The group released an official logo motion teaser and a silhouette teaser on September 1, 2021, announcing their debut in October 2021. BugAboo was the first group to make their debut under the company in six years, following the debut of their first boy group VAV. Two days prior to the release, they held a special debut showcase called Prick or BugAboo, which was live telecast on SBS MTV. On October 25, 2021, the group released their self-titled debut single album BugAboo. The music video received 10 million views on YouTube in a week and the song was first broadcast on SBS MTV's The Show the next day.

On June 13, 2022, BugAboo released their second and last single album, Pop. On December 8, 2022, A Team Entertainment shared that after long discussions, the company and the members had decided to disband the group and terminate the contracts of all members.

Members 
 Choyeon – leader
 Eunchae
 Yoona
 Rainie
 Cyan
 Zin

Discography

Single albums

Singles

Videography

Music video

References

External links 
  

2021 establishments in South Korea
2022 disestablishments in South Korea
K-pop music groups
Musical groups established in 2021
Musical groups disestablished in 2022
Musical groups from Seoul
South Korean girl groups
South Korean dance music groups